The Museion (from the greek μουσείον, meaning the temple of the muses) is the Museum of Modern and Contemporary Art of  Bolzano, in South Tyrol, Italy.

It was founded in 1985.
Since 2006 it has been  managed by the Museion Foundation, founded by the Autonomous Province Bozen and the Museion Association.
On 24 May 2008 the Museion opened to the public its new venue, built by the KSV - Krüger Schuberth Vandreike architects in the center of Bolzano.

Collections 
The Museion currently holds 4500 works of art, both from international and local artists, which are exhibited according to a theme-based rotation. Acquisitions often are made after temporary exhibitions. The displays of works of art in the collection are curated also by artists.
In recent years most acquisitions by the Museion have come from exhibitions on contemporary sculpture, and particularly by artists that conceive sculpture as a way to establish relationships between objects and spaces. During the opening of an exhibition by the American sculptor Carl Andre, the director of the Museion Letizia Ragaglia has declared: "The sculptures by Carl Andre are not objects meant to be contemplated, but a place to live in, where you can move, have experiences, and establish relationships through physical contact."

Main venue 
The main building of the Museion is a cube measuring 54 metres long, 25 metres high and 23 metres wide, with transparent front and rear façades. The building is a physical and symbolic link between the two parts of the city of Bozen.

Other venues 
Created in 2003, the Piccolo Museion – Cubo Garutti is a work by Alberto Garutti. Located in Via Sassari 17b, it functions as an outlying venue for Museion in the Don Bosco neighbourhood of Bolzano.

Library 
Specialised in modern and contemporary art, Museion’s library holds 25,000 volumes, 50 subscriptions to art journals and 400 DVDs.

Programs, exhibitions and events 
Since its opening, the Museion has focused its programme on research across diverse forms of artistic expressions, and has tried to develop close relationships with artists.

During the years the Museion has produced exhibition on the works of artists such as Sonic Youth, Mike Kelley, Rosemarie Trockel, Carl Andre, Danh Vo, and Martino Gamper.

Exhibitions

Criticism 
Right after the opening of the Museion's new venue, in May 2008, the first exhibition had on display, among others, the work "Zuerst die Füße" by the German artist Martin Kippenberger.
That work, conceived as a 'portrait' by the artist in 1990, depicts a crucified frog holding a beer in one hand and an egg in the other. According to the Museion, the sculpture has "nothing to do with religion, and represents instead the inner world of the artist himself following a difficult rehabilitation process from drugs and alcohol abuse."
During a visit by the Pope some regional politicians declared that the sculpture should be taken down.

Sandro Bondi, then Ministry of Cultural Heritage and Activities and Tourism
declared that the sculpture was "also an offense to common sense".

References

External links 
 
 KSV - Krüger, Schuberth, Vandreike
 Corriere della sera-direttrice licenziata
 

Art museums and galleries in Trentino-Alto Adige/Südtirol
Art museums established in 1985
Buildings and structures in Bolzano
Contemporary art galleries in Italy
1985 establishments in Italy
Art museums and galleries in Italy